Bremore Port was a proposed new deepwater port at Bremore, near Balbriggan, Ireland. It is being developed to provide an east coast deepwater port for Ireland to supplement the Drogheda and Dublin Port. It has moved its planned focus of development from Bremore Head to logistics and offshore jetties at Gormanston just over the border in Meath.

It is located near the main Dublin-Belfast road and rail links. The project is applying for Strategic infrastructure status (SIB).

References

External links
Drogheda Port Company Bremore Summary
Bremore Port Report
Ancient site may delay Bremore port
Balbriggan Chamber
New heart For Dublin - PD
Modern Antiquarian Bremore Passage tomb
Megalithomia Bremore passage tombs
Images
Megalithic.co.uk
Hidden artefacts at Bremore 
planning application

Ports and harbours of the Irish Sea
Ports and harbours of the Republic of Ireland